In addition to the Heart of Midlothian F.C. first team competing in the Scottish Premiership, the club also maintains a side in the Lowland Football League and various youth teams in their Academy setup.

Reserve Team
Hearts Reserves are the reserve team of Heart of Midlothian.

Hearts were members of the Scottish Premier Reserve League from its foundation in the 1998–99 season. The league started as an U21 League but reverted to an open age group league in season 2004–05. The Reserve League was abandoned for season 2009–10 due to financial constraints and a lack of support from other clubs. Hearts Reserves formerly played their home games at  Forthbank Stadium (the home of Stirling Albion). The team mainly consisted of Under-19 players and those on the fringe of the first team squad. Some of the first team also played when recovering from injury. The Reserves' head coach in that was Gary Locke.

In July 2018, it was reported that reserve leagues would be reintroduced in lieu of the development leagues that had been in place since 2009. The top tier of the new SPFL Reserve League featured 18 clubs, whilst a second-tier reserve League comprised nine clubs. Other than a minimum age of 16, no age restrictions applied to the leagues. At the end of its first season (2018–19)  several clubs intimated that they would withdraw from the Reserve League to play a variety of challenge matches, but Hearts were one of those who chose to remain.

Under-20 Team & development squad
The Heart of Midlothian Under-20 Team competes in the SPFL Development League previously the Scottish Premier Under 20s League.

In 2017, the Hearts academy was one of eight across the country designated 'elite' status on the introduction of Project Brave, an SFA initiative to concentrate the development of the best young players at a smaller number of clubs with high quality facilities and coaching than was previously the case.

The under-20s play their home matches at Ochilview Park, Stenhousemuir whilst training at Riccarton (Heriot-Watt University).

U20 development squad

Honours

Reserves
 Scottish Reserve League  (1955–1975)
 Champions: 1958
 Runners-up: 1957, 1971, 1972, 1975
 Premier Reserve League(1975–1998)
 Champions: 1993, 1997
 Runners-up: 1996
Scottish Premier Reserve League  (1998–2009)
 Champions: 1999–00
 Runners-up: 2003–04, 2008–09
SPFL Reserve League  (2018–)
 Runners-up: 2019–20
SPFL Reserve Cup
Winners: 2018–19

Youths
Scottish Youth Cup
 Winners (3): 1993, 1998, 2000
 Runners-up (3): 2006, 2014, 2016
SPL U-19/SPFL Development League
 Winners: 2001
 Runner-up (3): 2008–09, 2010–11, 2011–12

Former youth team players

 Gary Naysmith
 Scott Severin
 Stephen Simmons
 Robbie Neilson
 Craig Gordon
 Christophe Berra
 Andrew Driver
 Calum Elliot
 Lee Wallace
 Jamie MacDonald
 David Gray
 Eggert Jonsson
 Ryan McGowan
 David Templeton
 Gary Glen
 Arvydas Novikovas
 Conrad Balatoni
 Dylan McGowan
 Scott Robinson
 Denis Prychynenko
 Jamie Walker
 Jason Holt
 David Smith
 Callum Tapping
 Kevin McHattie
 Fraser Mullen
 Brad McKay
 Billy King
 Callum Paterson
 Jack Hamilton
 Dale Carrick
 Sam Nicholson
 Jason Cummings
 Gary Oliver
 Adam King
 Jordan McGhee
 Euan Henderson
 Harry Cochrane
 Chris Hamilton
 Cammy Logan
 Connor Smith
 Aaron Hickey

References

External links

Reserves 
 Hearts Official Website – Reserve squad profiles
 Scottish Premier League website – Reserve League news
 Scottish Premier League website – Reserve League tables
 Scottish Premier League website – Reserve League fixtures

Under-20s
 Roll of Honour at Hearts Youth Development Committee
 Academy Overview at Hearts Youth Development Committee
 Hearts official website – Under-19 Squad profiles
 Hearts launch Academy
 Scottish Premier League website – Under-19 League news
 Scottish Premier League website – Under-19 League tables
 Scottish Premier League website – Under-19 League fixtures
 Scottish Football Association website – SFA Youth Cup results and archive

Reserves
Scottish reserve football teams
Youth football in Scotland
Football academies in Scotland
Lowland Football League teams